Joshua Gregory Bugajski (born 5 October 1990) is a British rower. He won a silver medal in the eight at the 2019 European Rowing Championships. He won a bronze medal at the 2019 World Rowing Championships in Ottensheim, Austria as part of the eight with Thomas George, James Rudkin, Moe Sbihi, Jacob Dawson, Oliver Wynne-Griffith, Matthew Tarrant, Thomas Ford and Henry Fieldman.

In 2021, he won a European gold medal in the eight in Varese, Italy.

References

External links
 
 Joshua Bugajski at British Rowing
 
 
 

Living people
1990 births
British male rowers
World Rowing Championships medalists for Great Britain
Rowers at the 2020 Summer Olympics
Medalists at the 2020 Summer Olympics
Olympic medalists in rowing
Olympic bronze medallists for Great Britain
21st-century British people